Hague Bar is a hamlet in New Mills, Derbyshire, near Marple and Stockport. The Manchester to Sheffield railway passes through the Goyt valley at this point. Its population is included in the figures shown for New Mills. Hague Bar is the most westerly settlement in Derbyshire. The Goyt Way, part of the Midshires Way and the E2 European long-distance path, passes through the village on its  route from Etherow Country Park to Whaley Bridge.

See also
List of places in Derbyshire

References

External links

Hague Bar Flickr Group with photos of the local area

Villages in Derbyshire
Towns and villages of the Peak District
New Mills